The following is a comprehensive discography of Manowar, an American heavy metal band from Auburn, New York, founded in 1980 by Joey DeMaio, Ross "The Boss" Friedman, and Eric Adams. It includes thirteen studio albums, two EPs, and various other media. As of 2023, Manowar has sold more than 30 mln records worldwide.

Studio albums

Re-recorded albums

Live albums

Compilation albums

EPs

Singles
"Defender" (1983)
"All Men Play on 10" (1984)
"Blow Your Speakers" (1987)
"Herz Aus Stahl" "(Heart Of Steel)" (1988)
"Metal Warriors" (1992)
"Defender" (remixed) (1993)
"Return of the Warlord" (1996)
"Courage" (1996)
"Courage Live" (1996)
"Number 1" (1996)
"Live in Spain" (1998)
"Live in Portugal" (1998)
"Live in France" (1998)
"Live in Germany" (1998)
"Warriors of the World United" (2002) – GER #27, NOR #48, SWE #50
"An American Trilogy" / "The Fight for Freedom" (2002)
"The Dawn of Battle" (2002)
"King of Kings" (2005)
"Thunder in the Sky" (2009)
"Laut Und Hart Stark Und Schnell" (2023)

Video albums

References

Heavy metal group discographies
Discographies of American artists